The Las Vegas Legends are a semi-professional soccer team based in Paradise, Nevada. They play in the National Premier Soccer League, a fourth-tier league in the American soccer pyramid.

History
The club was founded in 2012 as an indoor soccer team as a member of the Major Arena Soccer League. During their time in the MASL, the Legends split their home games between the Orleans Arena and the Las Vegas Sports Park. The team's president and general manager is Meir Cohen. The team included a mix of local, regional, and international players. The team did not return after the 2015–16 season.

On September 5, 2019, it was announced that the club would return to competitive play in 2020 as a member of the National Premier Soccer League In 2021 The team finished 1st Place in the Southwest Division. In Fall 2021 the team joined the NISA Nation.

Las Vegas Legends U20 plays in the Nevada-Utah Premier League, where they won the 2021 season, as part of the SWPL.

Year-by-year

Honors 
Division titles
 2012-13 PASL Southwest Division Champions
 2012-13 PASL Southwest Division Playoff Champions
 2013-14 PASL Pacific Division Champions
 2013-14 PASL Pacific Division Playoff Champions
 2014-15 MASL Pacific Division Playoff Champions
 2015-16 MASL Southwest Division Champions
 2015-16 MASL Southwest Division Playoff Champions
 2020 - E-NPSL National Champions
 2021 - NPSL Southwest Division Champions

References

External links
 

 
Major Arena Soccer League teams
Professional Arena Soccer League teams
Indoor soccer clubs in the United States
2012 establishments in Nevada
Defunct indoor soccer clubs in the United States
Association football clubs established in 2012
Sports in the Las Vegas Valley
Soccer clubs in Nevada